OnTrack was a suburban rail line that operated in Syracuse, New York, from 1994 to 2008. The line ran from the Carousel Center (today's Destiny USA) on the city's north side via Armory Square and Syracuse University to Colvin Street, with summer weekend service south to Jamesville, mainly using 1950s-era diesel railcars.

The line was the result of a public-private partnership between the state of New York, Onondaga County and the New York, Susquehanna and Western Railway (NYSW), a Class II regional freight carrier. The NYSW received tax breaks and grants in exchange for operating passenger service on the Syracuse line. Although OnTrack was initially successful, ridership declined and was ultimately discontinued due to inadequate rush hour service, poor publicity and failure to connect to Syracuse's Amtrak and intercity bus routes. 

In recent years, there have been proposals to complete the line and restart passenger service, potentially as a light rail system.

History
Starting in the late 19th century, an extensive series of electric interurban railways served the Syracuse region, but by the 1930s local rail service ceased, and was replaced by buses and automobiles. In the 1990s, Syracuse University graduate Robert Colucci proposed converting for passenger service a roughly  segment of the old Delaware, Lackawanna and Western Railroad's Syracuse–Binghamton line between Carousel Center (now Destiny USA) in the north and Jamesville in the south. At the time, the little-used right of way was owned by Conrail which considered it a financial burden, so it was sold for $1 to the Onondaga County Industrial Development Agency (IDA). The Onondaga IDA leased the track to the New York, Susquehanna and Western Railway (NYSW) at a bargain rate, and allowed the NYSW to use it for freight service on the condition that a passenger rail service be run at least 250 days per year with 1,250 round trips. In addition, the NYSW received a $400,000 tax break from the state of New York in order to cover operating costs.

Since the rail infrastructure was already in place, the state of New York provided a $4.5 million grant to purchase rolling stock (four 1950 Budd Rail Diesel Cars) and construct passenger stations along the former freight line. OnTrack was incorporated on September 24, 1994 and the primary service (known as the "City Express") began in October between Syracuse University and Carousel Center, ten times a day and seven days a week. OnTrack initially exceeded expectations, carrying 45,757 passengers in its first three months of service. However, the line never turned a profit, and relied on state subsidies and volunteers to keep it running.

With the initial success of the line, NYSW proposed expansions to the service, including a 2002 proposal for intercity service from Syracuse to Binghamton, stopping at several OnTrack stations as well as Cortland. However, the schedule was not optimized for commuter usage. Rather, the train was meant to bring visitors to popular destinations such as downtown museums and restaurants, weekend excursion trips to Jamesville Beach Park, the "Santa Train", and the "Orange Express" special service for Carrier Dome events. 

A high priority project was a connection to the William F. Walsh Regional Transportation Center, where it could link directly to Amtrak and local/intercity buses, and the adjacent new Alliance Bank Stadium (now known as NBT Bank Stadium) and CNY Regional Market, which would make the line much more useful for commuters. This would require the construction of a new bridge over Park Street (State Route 370), so that local trains would not interfere with operations on the CSX (formerly New York Central) main line. Centro, Syracuse's local transportation agency, began construction on the bridge in 1998, and also prepared a platform at the Walsh Transportation Center to allow direct transfer between OnTrack and Amtrak trains. Congressman Jim Walsh approved a $3 million grant for the project. However, CSX objected due to concerns that construction might destabilize the adjacent freight rail bridge across Park Avenue. The bridge project never came to fruition, and more than 300 tons of steel budgeted for construction were scrapped. 

By the mid-2000s, ridership had dropped greatly due to the lack of continued publicity. Services were reduced, which led to further decrease in patronage. By 2003 the train ran only four days a week. It was found that NYSW had used large amounts of state grants and tax breaks to fund freight service and repair track on its other lines, rather than for OnTrack as the money had been intended. Another reason for the lack of growth in ridership was the lack of stations in residential areas, limiting the line's use by commuters. In 2007 service had been cut to weekends only and ridership had declined to 50 passengers per day, far short of the 500 per day required to be profitable. NYSWR chairman Walter Rich, one of OnTrack's major proponents, died in 2007, and the railroad's interest in continuing OnTrack service diminished. Regular service was terminated indefinitely in July 2007. The Orange Express ran its last train in March 2008. The line continues to be used, infrequently, by freight trains.

Route

The OnTrack route starts at Destiny USA in the north, and runs along the south shore of Onondaga Lake and under I-690 before turning southeast through the Westside neighborhoods of Syracuse, roughly paralleling Erie Boulevard. It passes directly through downtown Syracuse near Armory Square, turning south along Onondaga Creek, then through the Southside and under I-81 where it skirts the west side of the Syracuse University campus and Oakwood Cemetery to Colvin Street. The line then turns east through rolling countryside along I-481, leaving the city of Syracuse, and then south again towards Jamesville and along the western shore of Jamesville Reservoir to Jamesville Beach Park. Within Syracuse, the line passes through a mix of residential, commercial, retail and light industrial areas; south of Brighton Avenue and the city limits it traverses mostly undeveloped rural land.

The entire line north of Jamesville is grade-separated, and in downtown Syracuse most of the line is elevated. The line is single-tracked with passing sidings at Armory Square (old Downtown station) and Jamesville. The section south of Syracuse University was only used by special excursion trains, although in 1999 when parts of Interstate 81 were temporarily closed for construction, the federal government briefly subsidized free commuter service between Jamesville and downtown. Only four of the stations (Carousel Center, Armory Square, Syracuse University and the unfinished station at Alliance Bank Stadium) had covered platforms. The regular fare was $1.50, and the fare for the Orange Express was $4 (from Armory Square) or $5 (from Carousel Center).

List of stations

Rolling stock

OnTrack was operated with four Budd Rail Diesel Cars (RDC-1) "Buddliners" built in the 1950s. All OnTrack cars were owned by the New York, Susquehanna and Western Railway and returned to NYSW upon the demise of the commuter rail service. By 2008, the RDCs were either sold or out of service. The Orange Express required longer trains and used retired Metra passenger cars, pulled by various NYSW locomotives.

M-5: Budd RDC-1 built for New Haven Railroad (NHRR) #23 built in 1952; later served with Penn Central Transportation Company (PC) as #68; Metro-North Railroad (MNR) as # 18, Amtrak as # 18; sold to Conway Scenic Railroad of New Hampshire in May 2008
M-6: Budd RDC-1 built in 1953 for NHRR as # 37; later served with PC (#37); MNR (#11); Amtrak (#11); still owned by NYSWR 
M-7: Budd RDC-1 built in 1953 for NHRR as # 43; later served with PC (#43); MNR (#43) and now with Southern Railroad of New Jersey since 2008
M-8: Budd RDC-1 built in 1953 for New York Central Railroad as # 465; later served with PC (#65) and MNR (#65)

Future
Local authorities have discussed the possibility of renewed OnTrack service, perhaps as a light rail system. Eric Ennis, an economic development specialist for the city of Syracuse, has cited new development in the University Hill neighborhood, a residential boom in downtown, and the expansion of Destiny USA as potential sources of increased ridership. New stations in the low-income neighborhoods the line passes through would increase mobility for carless residents. The Syracuse Regional Airport Authority, which operates Syracuse Hancock International Airport, has also considered the potential benefits of restarting OnTrack service with an extension to the airport.

See also
Railroads in Syracuse, New York
Syracuse and Binghamton Railroad
Central New York Regional Transportation Authority

References

Works cited

External links

Syracuse in Focus OnTrack Photo Gallery
OnTrack's 10th Anniversary Photo Gallery
Article Containing a Short Video Clip of OnTrack
Ontrack Schedule for City Express
 NSWR roster

Defunct New York (state) railroads
Passenger rail transportation in New York (state)
Former United States regional rail systems
Defunct railroads in Syracuse, New York
Defunct public transport operators in the United States
Railway companies established in 1994
Railway companies disestablished in 2007